Frank Luke Jr. (May 19, 1897 – September 29, 1918) was an American fighter ace credited with 17 aerial victories, ranking him second among United States Army Air Service pilots after Captain Eddie Rickenbacker during World War I. Luke was the first airman to receive the Medal of Honor and first USAAS ace in a day. Luke Air Force Base, Arizona, a United States Air Force pilot training installation since World War II, is named in his honor.

Early life and career
Luke was born May 19, 1897, in Phoenix, Arizona, after his father emigrated from Germany to the United States in 1874 and settled there. Frank was his family's fifth child, and had eight brothers and sisters. He grew up excelling in sports, working in copper mines, and participating in bare-knuckle boxing matches. Following the United States' entry into World War I in April 1917, Frank enlisted in the Aviation Section, U.S. Signal Corps on September 25, 1917, and received pilot training in Texas and California. After being commissioned a second lieutenant in March 1918, he deployed to France for further training, and in July was assigned to the 27th Aero Squadron. Although Luke was still a 2nd lieutenant at the time of his death, Stephen Skinner's book The Stand notes that he later received a posthumous promotion to first lieutenant.

Because of his arrogance and occasional tendencies to fly alone and disobey orders, Luke was disliked by some of his peers and superiors. But the 27th was under standing orders to destroy German observation balloons. Because of this, Luke, along with his close friend Lieutenant Joseph Frank Wehner, continually volunteered to attack these important targets although they were heavily defended by anti-aircraft guns on the ground. The two pilots began a string of victories together, with Luke attacking the balloons and Wehner flying protective cover. Wehner was killed in action on September 18, 1918, by Georg von Hantelmann in a dogfight with Fokker D.VIIs, which were attacking Luke. Luke then shot down two of these D.VIIs, two balloons, and a Halberstadt; the last "credit" enabled Luke to achieve his 13th official kill—a Halberstadt Ctype observation plane of Flieger Abteilung 36.

Between September 12 and 29, Luke was credited with shooting down 14 German balloons and four airplanes: Luke achieved these 18 victories during just 10 sorties in eight days, a feat unsurpassed by any pilot in World War I.

Death

Luke's final flight took place during the first phase of the Meuse-Argonne Offensive. On September 28, 1918, after achieving his 14th and 15th victories, he landed his SPAD XIII at the French aerodrome at Cicognes where he spent the night, claiming engine trouble. When he returned to the 1st Pursuit Group's base at Rembercourt the next day, he was confronted by Captain Alfred A. Grant, his squadron's commanding officer. Despite being under threat of arrest by Grant for absence without leave, Luke took off without authorization and flew to a forward airbase at Verdun, where his sympathetic group commander, Major Hartney, canceled the arrest order and gave Luke tacit approval to continue his balloon hunting. 

That evening Luke flew to the front to attack three balloons in the vicinity of Dun-sur-Meuse, six miles behind the German lines. He first dropped a message to a nearby United States balloon company, alerting them to observe his imminent attacks. Luke shot down the enemy balloons, but was then severely wounded by a single machine gun bullet fired from a hilltop above him, a mile east of the last balloon site he had attacked. Luke landed in a field just west of the small village of Murvaux—after strafing a group of German soldiers on the ground—near the Ruisseau de Bradon, a stream leading to the Meuse River. Although weakened by his wound, he made his way toward the stream, intending to reach the cover of its adjacent underbrush, but finally collapsed some 200 meters from his airplane. Approached by German infantry, Luke drew his Colt Model 1911 pistol and fired a few rounds at his attackers before dying. Reports that a day later his body was found with an empty gun and a bullet hole in his chest, with seven dead Germans in front of him were proven erroneous. According to author Skinner, the fatal bullet, fired from the hilltop machine gun position, had entered near Luke's right shoulder, passed through his body, and exited from his left side.

On September 30, 1918, the Germans buried Luke in the Murvaux cemetery, from where his body was retrieved two months later by American forces. His final resting place is the Meuse-Argonne American Cemetery and Memorial, located east of the village of Romagne-sous-Montfaucon.

After the United States Army obtained sworn testimony from French and American sources, Luke was awarded a posthumous Medal of Honor. The presentation was made to Frank Luke Sr., in Phoenix in May 1919. The family later donated the medal to the National Museum of the United States Air Force near Dayton, Ohio. The museum's small exhibit honoring Luke also contains his flying goggles, the gunsight from his last SPAD, documents written by Luke, and other personal items. The museum's Early Years Gallery displays a fully restored SPAD XIII of the type flown by Luke.

Eddie Rickenbacker said of Luke: 
He was the most daring aviator and greatest fighter pilot of the entire war. His life is one of the brightest glories of our Air Service. He went on a rampage and shot down fourteen enemy aircraft, including ten balloons, in eight days. No other ace, even the dreaded Richthofen, had ever come close to that.

Other aces
Luke is often cited as the second-ranking United States ace of World War I, but that statement ignores certain American pilots who flew with other air services. Luke was, however, second only to Rickenbacker among pilots serving only with the AEF. (It is noteworthy that Luke's time on the front was comparatively quite short, and 17 of Luke's 18 victories were officially recorded as destroyed, versus only 11 of Rickenbacker's 26.) Americans flying with Britain's Royal Flying Corps (or Royal Air Force from April 1918) who exceeded Luke's score were Frederick W. Gillet (20 claims, all destroyed); Harold Albert Kullberg (19 confirmed) and Wilfred Beaver (19 claims, 12 destroyed). Tied with Luke at 18 was William C. Lambert.

Honors and awards

Medal of Honor citation
Rank and Organization: Second Lieutenant, 27th Aero Squadron, 1st Pursuit Group. Place and Date: Near Murvaux, France, September 29, 1918. Entered Service At Phoenix, Ariz. Born: May 19, 1897, Phoenix, Ariz. G. O. No.: 59, W.D., 1919.

Citation:

The citation contained errors attributable to confused accounts from French witnesses to Luke's final flight, and to a staff officer's re-write of the original write-up, which emphasized the numerous high-risk missions he flew between September 12 and 29. Reports that he was intercepted by German fighters, strafed enemy troops before his forced landing; and was "surrounded on all sides" were literal misinterpretations of French testimony and became part of the mythology that grew up around the event.

First Distinguished Service Cross
Citation:

Second Distinguished Service Cross
Citation:

Other honors
 Luke Air Force Base, located west of Phoenix, Arizona, was named after Luke.
 Memorial Statue by Roger Noble Burnham on the grounds of the State Capitol in Phoenix, Arizona.
 Memorial to Frank Luke and other members of the Phoenix Union High School Class of 1918, in front of the old Phoenix Union High School Building, Phoenix, Arizona.
 From 1919 to 1932, Luke Field, Territory of Hawaii, was named after Luke.
 Lukeville, Arizona, on the U.S. border is named after Luke.
 In 1975, Luke was inducted into the National Aviation Hall of Fame in Dayton, Ohio. 
 Frank Luke was named the Class Exemplar of the United States Air Force Academy's class of 2010.
 In the 2006 movie Flyboys, James Franco's leading character Blaine Rawlings is inspired by Frank Luke.
 Frank Luke Street near Addison Airport in Addison, Texas, is named after Luke.
 In the 2023 Chinese balloon incident, the military aircraft that shot down the balloon were call-signed "Frank01" and "Frank02," in honor of Luke's reputation as a balloon-buster.

See also

 List of Medal of Honor recipients for World War I
 List of World War I flying aces from the United States

References

Bibliography

External links
 Archived at Ghostarchive and the Wayback Machine: 
 
 
 
 
 

1897 births
1918 deaths
 Military personnel from Phoenix, Arizona
 American World War I flying aces
 United States Army Medal of Honor recipients
 United States Army officers
 American people of German descent
 American military personnel killed in World War I
 Burials at Meuse-Argonne American Cemetery
 Recipients of the Distinguished Service Cross (United States)
 Recipients of the War Merit Cross (Italy)
 World War I recipients of the Medal of Honor